INDIEPENDENCE is a festival "weekender" which takes place on the outskirts of Mitchelstown in northern County Cork, typically on the August Bank Holiday weekend. The festival features a variety of artists as well as comedy, spoken word, a small cinema and other attractions. INDIE, as it is known, has been shortlisted as one of the best small festivals in Europe several times as well as winning awards within Ireland.

Background
INDIEPENDENCE first started as a free festival in the town square in Mitchelstown, running as such in 2006, 2007 and 2008. Over these years artists such as The Frank & Walters, Gemma Hayes, The Republic of Loose, The Sultans of Ping, Delorentos, Director and The Blizzards performed at the single stage event. After capacity crowds in 2008, the festival moved to a green field site at O'Connell Park in 2009 and charged entry for the first time. This event featured The Super Furry Animals, Ocean Colour Scene, Villagers, The Blizzards and others. Despite poor weather, it was a success and the festival moved to Deer Farm in 2010.

Line-up Headliners

2006
The Sultans of Ping
The Frank & Walters
Fight Like Apes
The Aftermath

2007
Gemma Hayes
Cathy Davey
The Republic of Loose

2008
The Blizzards
Director
Delorentos
Fight Like Apes
Ham Sandwich

2009
Ocean Colour Scene
The Super Furry Animals
Mundy
The Blizzards
The Chapters
Fight Like Apes
Villagers

2010
Alabama 3
Reverend & The Makers
White Lies
The Coronas

2011
Editors
Ash
Therapy
The Coronas

2012
2manydjs
The Coronas
Feeder
British Sea Power
Maverick Sabre
Beardyman
Scroobius Pip
Jape
Japanese Popstars
Delorentos

2013
De La Soul
Bell X1
Bastille
We Are Scientists
Kodaline
Ryan Sheridan
Hudson Taylor
The Fratellis
Funeral For A Friend
And So I Watch You From Afar
Bosnian Rainbows

2014
Public Enemy
Tom Odell
White Lies
Hozier
Dan le Sac vs Scroobius Pip
Damien Dempsey
David Holmes
Delorentos
Hudson Taylor
The Minutes
Walking on Cars
The Sultans of Ping
The Coronas

2015
Kodaline
Basement Jaxx
The Dandy Warhols
Ash
Ham Sandwich
Embrace
Roisin O
Hermitage Green
The Academic
Jape
Mark Lanegan Band
The Young Folk
The Original Rudeboys

2016
Bell X1
Editors
Ash
The Kooks
Walking On Cars

2017
The Coronas
Tom Odell
Manic Street Preachers
Wild Beasts

References

External links
 Website

Indie rock festivals
Rock festivals in Ireland
Music festivals established in 2006
Summer events in the Republic of Ireland